The International Tennis Integrity Agency (ITIA) is the organisation responsible for safeguarding the integrity of professional tennis worldwide.  It is an upgraded version of Tennis Integrity Unit (2008–2020). It was established following a comprehensive review of integrity in the sport.

The ITIA assumed responsibility for administering the Tennis Anti-Corruption Program on its formation and for the Tennis Anti-Doping Programme on 1 January 2022.

In addition to prevention, education and drug testing activities, it gathers intelligence and investigates competition manipulation, most notably match fixing in tennis. It has the ability to impose fines and sanctions, and ban players, umpires, and other tennis officials from participating in sanctioned tournaments.

The organisation is an initiative from the International Governing Bodies (IGBs) of professional tennis: the ITF, ATP, WTA, and the four Grand Slam tournaments (the Australian Open, French Open, Wimbledon and US Open). The ITIA is legally independent of the IGBs and makes its own decisions on investigations and prosecutions. In this respect it is unusual in global sports.

Governance 

The ITIA is supervised by the Tennis Integrity Supervisory Board (TISB) which has 5 independent members and 4 tennis members, representing the IGBs. The TISB is currently chaired by Jennie Price CBE, former CEO of Sport England.

Leadership and staff 

The ITIA was founded by its first CEO Jonny Gray, a former Senior Partner and Global Head of Sport at Control Risks. And a former commanding officer of the Argyll and Sutherland Highlanders, decorated for service in the Troubles and the Iraq War. Appointed in 2019, it was announced in 2022 that he would step down having made a 'significant contribution to integrity in tennis'. In late 2022 it was announced that he would be succeeded by Karen Moorhouse, an executive with the Rugby Football League.

It has three Senior Directors. These are:

 Investigations. Jenni Kennedy, former head of integrity at The Football Association.
 Anti-Doping. Nicole Sapstead, former CEO of UKAD.
 Legal. Ben Rutherford, a former legal counsel at World Rugby.  
The ITIA has around 35 staff across intelligence, investigations, anti-doping, education & training, legal/case management, communications and administration.

Tennis Anti-Corruption Program 

One of the main responsibilities of the ITIA is to administer the Tennis Anti-Corruption Program (TACP) on behalf of the IGBs. The TACP is sets out the various corruption offences in professional tennis, including those related to betting, match fixing and competition manipulation. The ITIA investigates possible offences of the TACP. When it has a sufficiency of evidence it submits a case to an independent Anti-Corruption Hearing Officer (AHO) for a first instance hearing. There are currently seven AHOs. Appeals of first instance decisions are heard de novo at the Court of Arbitration for Sport in Lausanne, Switzerland.

Tennis Anti-Doping Programme 
Another main responsibility of the ITIA is to administer the Tennis Anti-Doping Programme (TADP) on behalf of the IGBs. Professional tennis players are tested for substances prohibited by the World Anti-Doping Agency (‘WADA’) and, upon a finding that an Anti-Doping Rule Violation has been committed, sanctions are imposed under the Programme in compliance with the requirements of the World Anti-Doping Code.

Tennis Integrity Protection Programme 
The ITIA also administers the Tennis Integrity Protection Programme (TIPP). TIPP is an interactive online e-learning programme designed to inform participants in the sport and thus to protect the integrity of the sport. TIPP is mandatory for all players and officials and must be completed every 2 years. The ITIA also recommend that all those working in tennis such as coaches, tournament staff and agents complete the programme.

Investigations and sanctions
Last updated on: 7 January 2022.

Current suspensions
  Majed Kilani (match official suspended for 7 years + US$7,000 fine to be repaid in equal yearly payments)
  Armando Alfonso Belardi Gonzalez (suspended for 2 years and six months + US$5,000 fine with US$4,000 suspended)
  Jonathan Kanar (suspended for 4 years and 6 months + US$2,000 fine)
  Juan Carlos Saez (8 years suspension)*
  Issam Taweel (5 years suspension with two years suspended + US$15,000 fine with US$13,000 suspended)
  Henry Atseye (3 years suspension, with one year suspended + US$5,000 fine with US$2,500 suspended)
  Marc Fornell-Mestres (provisionally suspended)
  Patricio Heras (suspended + US$25,000 fine)
  Barlaham Zuluaga Gaviria (suspended for 3 years + US$5,000 fine)
  Nikita Kryvonos (suspended + US$20,000 fine)
  Piotr Gadomski (suspended + US$15,000 fine)
  Gerard Joseph Platero Rodriguez (suspended for 4 years + US$15,000 fine)
  Antonis Kalaitzakis  (tournament director suspended for 16 months + US$3,000 fine)
  Alexey Izotov (chair empire suspended for 3 years + US$10,000 fine)
  Nicolás Arreche (provisionally suspended) 
  Arthur De Greef (provisionally suspended) 
  Romain Barbosa (provisionally suspended) 
  Alex Witmeur (provisionally suspended)  
  Mauricio Echazú Puente (provisionally suspended) 
*Appeal dismissed from The Court of Arbitration for Sport (CAS).

Banned
  Gerard Joseph Platero Rodriguez (4 years ban with six months suspended + US$15,000 fine)
  Nick Lindahl (7 years ban + US$35,000 fine)
  Enrique López Pérez (8 years ban + US$25,000 fine)*
  Yuri Khachatryan (10 years ban + US$50,000 fine)
  Pertti Vesantera (coach banned for 5 years + US$15,000 fine)
  George Kennedy (7 months ban + US$10,000 fine + US$9,000 suspended)
  Potito Starace (10 years ban + US$100,000 fine)
  David Rocher (line umpire banned for 1 year and 6 months + US$5,000 fine + US$4,000 suspended)
  Mostafa Hatem (3 years ban + US$3,000 fine)
  Dagmara Baskova (12 years ban + US$1,000 fine)
  Nikita Gudozhnikov (2 years and 6 months ban + US$7,500 fine)
  Roberto Maytín (14 years ban + US$100,000 fine + US$75,000 suspended)
  Barbora Palcatova (3 years ban with 15 months suspended + US$5,000 fine + US$3,500 suspended)
  Roman Khassanov (10 years ban + US$100,000 fine + US$75,000 suspended)
  Carlos Andrés Sepúlveda Navarro (3 years ban + US$10,000 fine + US$8,000 suspended)
  Amal Sultanbekov (5 years ban + US$8,000 fine)
  Hichem Yasri (3 months ban + US$5,000 fine)
  Dario Drebenstedt (1 year ban + US$5,000 fine)
  Mauricio Astorga (3 years ban + US$1,500 fine) 
  Amine Ahouda (11 years ban + US$5,000 fine)
  Anas Chakrouni (10 years ban + US$5,000 fine)
  Mohamed Zakaria Khalil (9 years ban + US$5,000 fine)
  Soufiane El Mesbahi (9 years ban + US$5,000 fine)
  Yassir Kilani (9 years ban + US$5,000 fine)
  Carlos Ramirez Utermann (1 year and 10 months ban + US$2,000 fine + US$8,000 suspended) 
  Roberto Santino Quintana Llamas (2 years ban + US$2,000 fine + US$8,000 suspended) 
  Nicolás Arreche (4 years ban + US$8,000 fine)
* Suspension contested and paused for Royal Spanish Tennis Association events, pending CAS ruling, by Superior Court of Justice of Madrid, Spain.

Lifetime ban
  Youssef Hossam
  Joao Olavo Soares de Souza (+ US$200,000 fine)
  Diego Matos (+ US$125,000 fine + US$12,000 refund)
  Helen Ploskina (+ US$20,000 fine)
  Mauricio Alvarez-Guzman*
  Daniele Bracciali (+ US$250,000 fine)
  Gleb Alekseenko (+ US$250,000 fine)
  Vadim Alekseenko (+ US$250,000 fine)
  Anucha Tongplew (chair empire)
  Apisit Promchai (chair empire)
  Chitchai Srililai (chair empire)
  Karim Hossam (+ US$15,000 fine)
  Dmytro Badanov (+ US$100,000 fine)
  Junn Mitsuhashi (+ US$50,000 fine)
  Konstantinos Mikos
  Alexandru-Daniel Carpen
  Joshua Chetty
  Alexandros Jakupovic
  Morgan Lamri (tennis official)
  Andrey Kumantsov
  Sergei Krotiouk(+ US$60,000 fine)
  Daniel Koellerer (+ US$100,000 fine)
  Karen Khachatryan (+ US$250,000 fine)
  Stanislav Poplavskyy (+ US$10,000 fine)
  Aleksandrina Naydenova (+ US$150,000 fine)
  Aymen Ikhlef (+ US$100,000 fine)
  Sofia Dmitrieva
  Alija Merdeeva
  Abiodun Oyegoke
  Bukola Popoola 
  Franco Feitt (+ US$25,000 fine)
  Temur Ismailov [+ US$12,000 (previously) + U$14,000 fine]
  Simohamed Hirs (+ US$35,000 fine)
  Albina Khabibulina (+ US$150,000 fine)
  Ayoub Chakrouni (+ US$10,000 fine)
*Appeal dismissed from The Court of Arbitration for Sport (CAS).

See also

 International Tennis Federation
 ATP Challenger Tour
 ATP rankings
 List of ATP number 1 ranked singles tennis players
 List of ATP number 1 ranked doubles tennis players
 ATP Awards
 ATP Tour records
 Grand Prix Tennis Circuit
 World Championship Tennis
 ATP Champions Tour
 Grand Slam (tennis)
 Women's Tennis Association
 Tennis Integrity Unit

References

External links 
 Official website

Tennis organizations

Anti-doping organizations
Roehampton
2021 establishments in England
Sports organizations established in 2021
Organisations based in the London Borough of Wandsworth
Sport in the London Borough of Wandsworth